Cheongchun FC Hungry Eleven is a South Korean TV football-variety show that debuted on 11 July 2015 on KBS2.

References

External links
 
 

2015 South Korean television series debuts
Korean Broadcasting System original programming
Korean-language television shows
South Korean variety television shows
South Korean sports television series
Association football reality television series
Football clubs in South Korea
Amateur association football teams